Geothermal power in New Zealand is a small but significant part of the energy generation capacity of the country, providing approximately 17% of the country's electricity with installed capacity of over 900MW. New Zealand, like only a small number of other countries worldwide, has numerous geothermal sites that could be developed for exploitation, and also boasts some of the earliest large-scale use of geothermal energy in the world.

Geothermal energy has been described as New Zealand's most reliable renewable energy source, above wind, solar and even hydroelectricity, due to its lack of dependence on the weather. It has also been described as the currently (2000s and 2010s) most attractive new source of energy for New Zealand, as petrochemical fuel prices rise and easy hydro power sites have been tapped - it has been estimated that another 1000MW of geothermal resource can be used for generating electricity.

Geothermal fields 
The exploration of New Zealand's geothermal fields has been very extensive, and by the 1980s, most fields were considered mapped, with 129 found, of which 14 are in the 70-140 °C range, 7 in the 140-220 °C range and 15 in the >220 °C range. Currently, some potential new geothermal fields are being surveyed that have no surface expression.

New Zealand's high-temperature geothermal fields are mostly concentrated around the Taupo Volcanic Zone (which also has most of the currently operating generation capacity), in the central North Island, with another major field at Ngawha Springs in Northland. However, more systems (some of them potentially exploitable) are scattered all over the country, from the Hauraki Plains to the Bay of Plenty to numerous hot springs in the South Island, most of them associated with faults and other tectonic features.

Many applications of geothermal energy in New Zealand reinject the cooled steam / fluid back into the underground fields, to extend or infinitely use the fields as power sources.

History 

Geothermal energy use in New Zealand is strongly tied to Wairakei, where the first geothermal plant was opened in 1958. At that time, it was only the second large-scale plant existing worldwide (the first being the Valle del Diavolo 'Devil's Valley' plant in Larderello, Italy opened in 1911). Several new plants and efficiency-enhancing second-stage equipment have been added since, though there is also some loss of steam generation due to the decade-long drawdown. Some plants are therefore capped in steam extraction volumes to allow the fields to regenerate, and a percentage of the steam/water is reinjected.

The Mokai and Rotokawa geothermal plant was the first to come into operation via a resource consent applied for and issued under the Resource Management Act.

The 5 years up until 2016 saw a number of new power stations completed. Kawarau 90MW, Nga Awa Purua 140MW, Ngatamariki 80MW and Te Mihi 140MW.

Research
Considerable geothermal research expertise exists at New Zealand's Crown Research Institutes and universities.  In particular, at GNS Science, Industrial Research Limited, and the Geothermal Program at the University of Auckland. New Zealand is also one of the partner nations of the International Partnership for Energy development in Island Nations (EDIN). As part of EDIN, New Zealand is involved in international research projects to evaluate and increase geothermal power generation domestically as well as in 18 Pacific Island nations.

Laws and regulations
Geothermal Energy Act 1953
The Geothermal Energy Act 1953 was made redundant by the Resource Management Act 1991 (RMA). The Geothermal Energy Act granted water rights, which have generally been replaced by RMA resource consents.

Geothermal Energy Regulations 1961
The Geothermal Energy Regulations 1961 define the role of "geothermal inspectors" and specify processes for applications for authorities and licences.

Rotorua City Geothermal Energy Empowering Act 1967
The Rotorua City Geothermal Energy Empowering Act 1967 is an Act to enable the Rotorua City Council to make provisions for the control of the tapping and use of geothermal energy in the city of Rotorua.

Resource Management Act 1991
The Resource Management Act 1991 (RMA) is a significant, and at times, controversial Act of Parliament passed in 1991. The RMA regulates access to natural and physical resources such as land, air and water, with sustainable use of these resources being the overriding goal. New Zealand's Ministry for the Environment describes the RMA as New Zealand's principal legislation for environmental management.

The Resource Management Act is the principal legislation controlling the use of geothermal resources in New Zealand. The New Zealand Geothermal Association considers the procedures which are currently being adopted under the RMA as the single largest obstacle to further geothermal development, holding that "the regulatory process leads to long delays which impose a significant up-front cost on projects, reducing their financial viability".

List of geothermal power stations

Under construction

Geothermal development projects include Tauhara stage 2.

See also

 Energy in New Zealand
 Electricity sector in New Zealand
 Geothermal areas in New Zealand
 Renewable energy commercialisation
 Solar power in New Zealand
 Wind power in New Zealand
 Ocean power in New Zealand
 Biofuel in New Zealand
 Hydroelectric power in New Zealand
 Solar hot water in New Zealand
 Renewable energy in New Zealand
 Renewable energy by country

References

Further reading

External links
 Geothermal energy in New Zealand (from Te Ara: The Encyclopedia of New Zealand)